Amphidromus heinrichhuberi is a species of large-sized air-breathing tree snail, an arboreal gastropod mollusk in the family Camaenidae.

Morphology 
This species is easy to be distinguished from other Amphidromus species by the large adult size, presence of a prominent ridge bordering siphonal fasciole and unique yellow and green periostracum.

Distribution 
The type locality is Lâm Đồng Province in south Vietnam.

Etymology 
This species is named after Heinrich Huber, father of the second author, Franz Huber, who provided the type material.

References 

heinrichhuberi
Gastropods described in 2016